The 1000 Kilometres of Istanbul was a sports car race held at Istanbul Park in Istanbul, Turkey. The race was first held on 13 November 2005 as part of the 2005 Le Mans Endurance Series season and last held on 9 April 2006 as part of the 2006 Le Mans Series season. It has been a part of the Le Mans Endurance Series and Le Mans Series. In 2005, in its debut, the race ended after 6 hours when 1000 km were not covered by that time. In 2006 it was shortened to 4 hours due to a fuel logistics issue, and it was not held next season.

Winners

References

External links

Racing Sports Cars: Istanbul archive

European Le Mans Series races
Auto races in Turkey
Sports car races